Loo table is  a table model from the 18th and 19th centuries, originally designed for the card game loo, which was also known as lanterloo.

The typical loo table has an oval or round top, and a hinged mechanism fitted to a pedestal base, enabling the table to be easily stored when not in use. Sometimes, antique dealers call any table with a folding mechanism a "loo table", even if the table top is square or rectangular.

A loo-table stands in the hall at Midnight Place in the children's fiction book Midnight is a Place by Joan Aiken.

References

Tables (furniture)
History of furniture
19th century in England
English furniture